Cranston is a master planned residential community in the southeast quadrant of Calgary, Alberta.  Cranston contains a wide range of single family and multi family residential as well as commercial property. It has two public elementary schools and one separate board K-9 school, as well as Century Hall - a private Cranston residents recreation facility.  It is bounded by Stoney Trail to the north and Fish Creek Park and the Bow River to the west and south. Its eastern boundary is Deerfoot Trail and the community of Auburn Bay and the mixed use town centre development of Seton and South Health Campus hospital.
It is represented in the Calgary City Council by the Ward 12 councillor.

Demographics

Education
In September 2010, the Calgary Board of Education opened Cranston Elementary School which serves K-4 students residing in Cranston. Additionally, the Calgary Catholic School District opened the Christ the King School in September 2010. In January of 2017, Doctor George Stanley school opened.

Transit
Cranston is served by Calgary Transit Bus Route 14 in the west end, Route 406 in the east end, and Route 468 in the South End.

Community amenities
Cranston Market is a feature of the community that provides the residents of the community many different stores and services.  Some of the tenants of the Market include Sobeys, Petro Canada, the Berwick Public House, Subway, Good Earth Cafe as well as many professional services such as a dentist, an optometrist and a veterinary clinic.

Cranston Residents Association 
Directly across the street from the Market is Cranston Residents Association (CRA) at Century Hall. Residents of Cranston have access to the facility included with the homeowner association fees and can bring up to five guests per household. The facility is not-for-profit company that is professionally managed and operated. Residents of Cranston get access included with homeowner association fees, which also provide maintenance of several community features such as entry ways and boulevards. Non-residents are able to access the facility with a small fee.  There is a full size gymnasium as well as a  gated park which includes tennis courts, hockey rink, basketball courts, a playground and a waterpark. The gym and ice rink operate on a strict schedule. An up to date copy is available on the website or by calling the front desk. Schedules are subject to change without notice.     

Registered programs include various children and adult activities ranging from tennis, ballet, art classes, and yoga. Residents of Cranston and those who live in a Calgary Brookfield community are able to register for a discounted price, others pay in full. CRA also run themed day camp's for school aged children during winter, spring, and summer.      

Rooms and banquet hall can be booked for private events including weddings, business meetings, birthday parties, and others. Cranston residents are offered a discounted rate.      

Within Cranston is Riverstone, a serene treasure of the south. It is surrounded by green spaces, Fish Creek park, and accessible pathways that create a picturesque living space. CRA provides supplemental maintenance to residents of Riverstone including: maintenance of decorative corner, seasonal light display, pet waste stations, annual & perennial planting, Riverstone specific events, and several more.

See also
List of neighbourhoods in Calgary

References
Notes

External links

Neighbourhoods in Calgary